This list of museums in North Yorkshire, England contains museums which are defined for this context as institutions (including nonprofit organizations, government entities, and private businesses) that collect and care for objects of cultural, artistic, scientific, or historical interest and make their collections or related exhibits available for public viewing. Also included are non-profit art galleries and university art galleries.  Museums that exist only in cyberspace (i.e., virtual museums) are not included.

Defunct museums
 Duncombe Park, Helmsley, house closed to the public in 2011, gardens open

See also
 :Category:Tourist attractions in North Yorkshire

References

Yorkshire Moors and Coast - Tourism Guide
Harrogate Museums
Hambledon District Museums
Richmondshire Museums
Discovery Yorkshire Coast

 
North Yorkshire
Museums